Willard Lincoln Lemmon (September 30, 1924 – November 24, 2012) was an American politician. A member of the Democratic Party, he served in the Virginia House of Delegates from 1968 to 1982.

References

External links 
 
 

1924 births
2012 deaths
People from Marion, Virginia
Democratic Party members of the Virginia House of Delegates
20th-century American politicians